The Canton of Bois-Guillaume is a canton situated in the Seine-Maritime département and in the Normandy region of northern France. It covers northern suburbs of Rouen, including the town of Bois-Guillaume, and the rural area north of Rouen.

Composition 
At the French canton reorganisation which came into effect in March 2015, the canton was expanded from 3 to 19 communes:

Anceaumeville
Authieux-Ratiéville
Bihorel
Le Bocasse
Bois-Guillaume
Bosc-Guérard-Saint-Adrien
Claville-Motteville
Clères
Esteville
Fontaine-le-Bourg
Frichemesnil
Grugny
La Houssaye-Béranger
Isneauville 
Mont-Cauvaire
Montville
Quincampoix
Saint-Georges-sur-Fontaine
Sierville

Population

See also 
 Arrondissements of the Seine-Maritime department
 Cantons of the Seine-Maritime department
 Communes of the Seine-Maritime department

References

Bois-Guillaume